Kirk R. Johnson (born 1960) is an American paleontologist, author, curator, and museum administrator, and is currently serving as Sant Director of Smithsonian National Museum of Natural History.

Early life and education
Johnson was born in 1960 and grew up in Seattle, Washington. He attended Amherst College as an undergraduate, where he received a bachelor's degree in geology and fine arts. He joined Chi Psi Fraternity. He then attended the University of Pennsylvania, earning a master's degree in geology and paleobotany. He received his Ph.D. in geology and paleobotany from Yale University in 1989.

While in graduate school, in 1987, Johnson discovered an extinct species of linden leaf, which was named Tilia johnsoni in his honor. His postdoctoral work included field research in the northern Australian rainforests, while he served as a postdoctoral research associate in the department of botany at the University of Adelaide.

Career
From 1991 to 2012, Johnson worked at the Denver Museum of Nature and Science, first as a lead scientist, then the chief curator and vice president of research and collections. In 2010, he led a nine-month excavation of thousands of Ice Age animal bones, including mammoths and mastodons, in Snowmass Village, Colorado.

In 2012 Johnson was selected to lead the National Museum of Natural History in Washington, D.C., one of the Smithsonian Institution’s most popular museums on the National Mall. He is the host of the PBS Nova series, Making North America, which is a three-part series that describes the shaping of North America, which aired on November 4, 11 and 18, 2015. He is also the host of the two-hour Nova special Polar Extremes, first shown on February 5, 2020, which explores the history of the North and South Poles ranging from ice sheets to warm forests.

Personal life
Johnson's sister, Kirsten Johnson, is a documentary filmmaker and cinematographer, whose Dick Johnson Is Dead explores their father's battle with dementia.

Selected books

Awards and honors
 Fellow, American Association for the Advancement of Science, 2023

References

External links

1960 births
Living people
American paleontologists
Smithsonian Institution people
Amherst College alumni
University of Pennsylvania alumni
Yale University alumni
Directors of museums in the United States
Scientists from Seattle
Paleobotanists
Fellows of the American Association for the Advancement of Science